Jean Verheyen (born 22 December 1896, date of death unknown) was a Belgian cyclist. He competed in two events at the 1924 Summer Olympics.

References

External links
 

1896 births
Year of death missing
Belgian male cyclists
Olympic cyclists of Belgium
Cyclists at the 1924 Summer Olympics
Cyclists from Antwerp